Geoff Pitchford (born 13 August 1936) is a British alpine skier. He competed in three events at the 1960 Winter Olympics.

References

1936 births
Living people
British male alpine skiers
Olympic alpine skiers of Great Britain
Alpine skiers at the 1960 Winter Olympics
People from Brahmapur